Peace TV Bangla is the Bengali-language channel of the UAE-based Peace TV. The founder and president of Peace TV Bangla is Zakir Naik, an Islamic preacher from Mumbai, India. It was launched on April 22, 2011, and is broadcasting worldwide.

After the terrorist attack in Dhaka, which caused 29 casualties, including 20 hostages (18 foreigners and 2 locals), investigations in the matter revealed that one of the terrorists involved in the attack had posted sermons of Zakir Naik on social media where he urged "all Muslims to be terrorists" by saying "if he is terrorizing a terrorist, he is following Islam". Due to this, the Government of Bangladesh outlawed the channel, along with its English-language sister, on July 10, 2016.

Staff and presenters
 Zakir Naik
 Abdul Qayum
 Mamunul Haque

Logos

See also
 Islamic TV
 Channel S
 Diganta Television

References

External links

Television stations in Mumbai
Islamic television networks
Censorship in India
Television channels and stations established in 2011
Bengali-language television channels
Mass media in Dubai
Religious television channels in Bangladesh